Kaiminani is an unincorporated community and census-designated place (CDP) in Hawaii County, Hawaii, United States. It is the westernmost community on the island of Hawaii and is bordered to the east by Kaloko and to the south by Kailua.

The community was first listed as a CDP prior to the 2020 census.

Demographics

References 

Census-designated places in Hawaii County, Hawaii
Census-designated places in Hawaii
Unincorporated communities in Hawaii County, Hawaii